Jeffrey or Jeff Taylor may refer to:

Sports
 Jeffery Taylor (born 1989), Swedish-American basketball player; son of basketball player Jeff Taylor
 Jeff Taylor (basketball) (1960–2020), American basketball player
 Jeff Taylor (footballer) (1930–2010), British footballer
 Jeff Taylor (ice hockey), American ice hockey player drafted by the Pittsburgh Penguins in 2014 NHL Entry Draft
 Jeff Taylor (wrestler) or Scotty 2 Hotty (born 1973), American professional wrestler

Other
 Jeffrey A. Taylor, former United States Attorney
 Jeff Taylor (entrepreneur), American internet entrepreneur, founder of Monster.com
 Jeff Taylor (journalist), 1992 Pulitzer Prize winner
Jeff Taylor (politician), American professor and politician from Iowa

See also 
 Geoffrey Taylor (disambiguation)